Franklin Agustín Salas Narváez (born 30 August 1981) is an Ecuadorian former professional footballer who played as a forward.

His nickname is El Mago, meaning wizard or magician.

Club career
Salas began his career in the youth ranks of LDU Quito, and in 2000 made his debut with the senior side. Noted for his skillful dribbling skills and his pace, his hard shot from 25 yards won the award for the goal of the tournament in the 2005 Copa Sudamericana. In late 2006, Salas had a trial with PSV Eindhoven, but Ronald Koeman did not offer him a contract.

On 16 July 2007, Salas was presented along with Argentine Hernán Barcos and Colombian Mauricio Molina, as the three new South American players for Red Star Belgrade, former European Cup champions. In 2008, Salas made a return to LDU Quito after a bad run with the Serbian club.

After half-a-year on loan at Imbabura, Salas joined Godoy Cruz in the Argentine Primera División.

International career
Salas was called for the Ecuador national under-20 football team to play the 2001 FIFA World Youth Championship, where he made three substitutes appearances.

Subsequently, he was a regular member of the Ecuador national football team during the 2006 FIFA World Cup qualification phase, but was not called up to the World Cup squad due to a serious knee injury which required surgery. He scored the winning goal against Colombia in World Cup qualification on 2 June 2004.

Franklin was also voted as one of the 3 best players of the 2004 Copa América, along Robinho and Carlos Tevez.

Honors
LDU Quito
Ecuadorian Serie A: 2003, 2005 Apertura, 2010
Ecuadorian Serie B: 2001
Copa Libertadores: 2008
Copa Sudamericana: 2009
Recopa Sudamericana: 2009, 2010

Olmedo
Ecuadorian Serie B: 2013

References

External links
Profile at FEF

1981 births
Living people
People from Santo Domingo de los Colorados
Association football forwards
Ecuadorian footballers
Ecuador international footballers
2004 Copa América players
L.D.U. Quito footballers
Red Star Belgrade footballers
Imbabura S.C. footballers
Godoy Cruz Antonio Tomba footballers
L.D.U. Loja footballers
C.D. Olmedo footballers
S.D. Quito footballers
Serbian SuperLiga players
Ecuadorian expatriate footballers
Expatriate footballers in Argentina
Expatriate footballers in Serbia